Coolsaragh is a townland lying within the civil parish of Kilcronaghan, County Londonderry, Northern Ireland. It lies in the south of the parish on the boundary with the civil parish of Desertmartin, and it is bounded by the townlands of: Annagh & Moneysterlinn, Cloughfin, Gortahurk, Keenaght, Killynumber, Killytoney, Longfield, and Tullyroan. It was apportioned to the Drapers company.

The townland was part of the Tobermore electoral ward of the former Magherafelt District Council, however in 1901 and 1926 it was part of Iniscarn district electoral division as part of the Draperstown dispensary (registrar's) district of Magherafelt Rural District. It was also part of the historic barony of Loughinsholin.

Etymology
Coolsaragh, despite the various different spellings, many of which contain erroneous letters, such as h for r and f for s, appears to derive from something like Culsaran or Coolsaran. The loss of the n at the end of the word, whilst not common in Irish placenames, has occasionally occurred elsewhere.

The "saran" could possibly be derived from the Irish word során, which means "wireworm", a kind of insect that is a considerable pest for farmers, eating the roots of tuberous plants. This would give the derivation of Cúil Során, meaning "recess of the wireworms". This however is unlikely to be the origin of Coolsaragh as it doesn't contain an article meaning "of the". The lack of this article suggests either a personal name or a now obsolete noun. The personal name Sárán is used in the townlands of Kilsaran and Tisaran, and was the name of several saints and an early king of Ulster, and is quite possibly the meaning of "saran" in Culsaran or Coolsaran.

History

See also
Kilcronaghan
List of townlands in Tobermore
Tobermore

References

Townlands of County Londonderry
Civil parish of Kilcronaghan